In the inaugural edition of the tournament, Harold Solomon won the title by defeating Ken Rosewall 6–5, 6–2, 2–6, 0–6, 6–3 in the final.

The tournament was played in three stages. The preliminary draw was played at the World of Tennis Resort in Lakeway, Texas, with the top half being played in March and the bottom half being played in July. The final match was played at the Madison Square Garden in New York City, New York.

Draw

Final (September)

Top half (March)

Bottom half (July)

References

External links
 Official results archive (ATP)
 Official results archive (ITF)

Singles